Steven Black (born December 11, 1986) is a former professional American football wide receiver. Black signed as a free agent with the BC Lions on May 19, 2010. He played college football for the Memphis Tigers.

College career
Black played collegiately at Memphis.

Professional career

BC Lions
Black was signed by the BC Lions of the Canadian Football League on May 19, 2010.

Spokane Shock
Black was a member of the Spokane Shock of the Arena Football League in 2012. Black re-signed with Shock for the 2013 season. Black was released on July 3, 2013.

Pittsburgh Power
Black was claimed off of reassigned by the Pittsburgh Power on July 5, 2013, and was placed on the refused to report list on July 6.

Return to Spokane
Black was assigned to the Shock on May 15, 2014.

References

External links
Memphis bio

1986 births
Living people
African-American players of Canadian football
American players of Canadian football
Canadian football linebackers
East Mississippi Lions football players
Memphis Tigers football players
Pittsburgh Steelers players
BC Lions players
Spokane Shock players
Pittsburgh Power players
21st-century African-American sportspeople
20th-century African-American people